The Dunlop World Challenge is a tournament for professional tennis players played on indoor carpet courts. The event is classified as a €35,000+H Challenger tournament for men and a $50,000+H ITF Women's Circuit tournament for women. It has been held annually in Toyota, Japan, since 2008. The 2017 edition of the tournament was the final edition.

Past finals

Men's singles

Men's doubles

Women's singles

Women's doubles

External links
 Official website 
 ITF search

 
ATP Challenger Tour
ITF Women's World Tennis Tour
Carpet court tennis tournaments
Recurring sporting events established in 2008
Recurring sporting events disestablished in 2017
Tennis tournaments in Japan
Toyota, Aichi
Sport in Aichi Prefecture
2008 establishments in Japan
2017 disestablishments in Japan